BSP may refer to:

Business
 Bell System Practices, technical documentation series published internally by the AT&T Bell System
 Billing and Settlement Plan, an accounting system for airlines
 Business service provider, a category of company providing business processes as services
 Business system planning, a method of analysing, defining and designing the information architecture of organisations

Science and technology
 Bone sialoprotein, a component of mineralized tissues
 British Standard Pipe, an international standard set of screw thread sizes used in pipes and pipe fittings outside the US
 Bromsulphthalein, a dye used in liver function tests

Computing
 Binary space partitioning, a method for recursively subdividing a space
 Bit-slice processor, a cascadable processor architecture
 BSP (file format), used in games such as the Quake series and games that use the Source game engine
 Blog service provider, a company offering blog services
 Board support package, software needed to operate motherboards
 Boot-strap-processor, used to start a computer
 Broadband service provider, a company offering Internet access
 Bug squashing party, a collaborative event held to eliminate software bugs
 Bulk synchronous parallel, an abstract computer model for designing parallel algorithms
 Business system planning, a business methodology developed by IBM
 Byte Stream Protocol, part of the Xerox PARC Universal Packet network protocol suite

Organisations
 Bangko Sentral ng Pilipinas, the Central Bank of the Philippines
 Bank South Pacific, the largest bank in Papua New Guinea
 Beta Sigma Phi, a non-academic sorority
 Bhilai Steel Plant, in India
 Boy Scouts of the Philippines
 British School of Paris
 British Society for Phenomenology
 Brunei Shell Petroleum, a joint venture between the Government of Brunei and Shell

Politics
 Bahujan Samaj Party, India
 Bahujan Samaj Party of Nepal
 Belgian Socialist Party
 Bibeksheel Sajha Party, Nepal
 Bolshevik Samasamaja Party, Ceylon
 British Socialist Party
 Bulgarian Socialist Party

Places
 Bayside State Prison, New Jersey, US
 Baxter State Park, a wilderness park in Maine, US
 Brondesbury Park railway station (station code), London, England

Other uses
 Bachelor of Pharmacy, an undergraduate academic degree in pharmacy
 Bachelor of Science in Paramedicine, a four-year academic degree in the science and principles of paramedicine
 British Sea Power, a band
 Cartagena Protocol on Biosafety, or biosafety protocol

See also
 .bsp (disambiguation)